The Parallel Otherworld is the sixth and final album by metal band Eidolon, released in 2006.

The album was reviewed with 6/10 in Metal.de, 8.0 in Rockhard.de and 9/10 in Blabbermouth.net.

Track listing
All music by Glen and Shawn Drover and all lyrics by Nils K. Rue, except The Oath by King Diamond

"The Parallel Otherworld" – 11:31
"Arcturus #9" – 5:13
"The Eternal Call" – 6:05
"Ghost World" – 7:29
"Thousand Winters Old" – 5:50
"Spirit Sanctuary" – 4:53
"Order of the White Light" – 5:49
"Astral Flight" – 6:14
"Shadowanderer (Ferdamannen)" – 7:08
"The Oath" (Mercyful Fate cover) – 7:46

Credits 
 Nils K. Rue – vocals
 Glen Drover – guitars, Keyboards
 Adrian Robichaud – bass
 Shawn Drover – drums

Guests 
 Michael Romeo – solos on track 2
 Chris Caffery – solo on track 3
 Frank Aresti – solo on track 3
 Robert MacDonald – solo on track 5
 Kim Mitchell – solo on track 7
 Michael Denner – solos on track 10
 Hank Shermann – solos on track 10

References

2006 albums
Eidolon (band) albums